Raquel Valeria Chacón González (born 17 November 1994) is a Costa Rican footballer who plays as a midfielder for Alajuelense CODEA and the Costa Rica women's national team.

Career
Chacón joined the Costa Rica women's national team squad for the first time for the 2020 CONCACAF Women's Olympic Qualifying Championship. She previously had rejected call-ups due to obligations to work at her grandfather's supermarket. Chacón made her international debut on 28 January 2020, coming on as a substitute in the 78th minute for Raquel Rodríguez in the 6–1 win against Panama.

References

External links
 

1994 births
Living people
Costa Rican women's footballers
Costa Rica women's international footballers
Women's association football midfielders